Lidice (also known as Fall of the Innocent in the UK) is a 2011 Czech drama film produced by Adam Dvořák from a screenplay by Zdenek Mahler. It was initially directed by Alice Nellis, but after she contracted Lyme disease (borreliosis), Petr Nikolaev took over. It tells a story involving the Nazi massacre at—and destruction of—the Czech village of Lidice. It was released in June 2011. The film is streaming on Amazon Prime under the title Fall of the Innocent (US, 15 April 2018).

The budget of the film was around 65–70 million Kč (around US $4 million).

Plot 
The film is presented as a true story set during World War II. With the German takeover of Europe under way, the deputy Reichsprotektor Reinhard Heydrich arrives in Prague and his underlings begin enforcing his authority in the towns and villages across the occupied country. In Lidice, the film's main protagonist, František Šíma, is sent to prison following a family dispute that boils over resulting in the accidental death of one of his sons. During Šíma's incarceration one of the other villagers, Václav Fiala, strings along his mistress with lies about his bravery as a resistance fighter against the Germans. Heydrich is assassinated and during the Gestapo investigation that follows, a letter Fiala has written describing his supposed heroism comes to their attention. It leads to the total destruction of Lidice and the mass execution and deportations of its citizens. Throughout the atrocity, Šíma remains in jail, where news of what happened is kept from him. On his release, he returns to Lidice, where he finds the village has been obliterated and finally learns of the tragic events.

Cast
 Karel Roden as František Šíma
 Zuzana Fialová as Marie Vaňková
 Zuzana Bydžovská as Anežka Šímová
 Marek Adamczyk as Václav Fiala
 Veronika Khek Kubařová as Anička
 Roman Luknár as Vlček
 Ondřej Novák as Karel Šíma
 Adam Kubišta as Eda Šíma
 Norbert Lichý as Mayor
 Jan Budař as Safecracker Petiška
 Václav Jiráček as Josef Horák
 Joachim Paul Assböck as Harald Wiesmann
 Sabina Remundová as Tonička Farská
 Anna Kratochvílová as Růženka
 Ondřej Havel as Toník
 Marika Šoposká as Helenka
 Detlef Bothe as Reinhard Heydrich

Production
Filming started on 26 July 2010 at the Mladá Boleslav prison, with Karel Schwarzenberg attending the first cut. The shoot lasted 49 days and involved locations including Nové Strašecí, and a secondary school in Kladno. The scenes portraying Lidice were shot at the village of Chcebuz near Štětí.

The first promotional posters appeared at the film festival in Karlovy Vary 2010 on 8 July 2010.

References

External links

 
 Fall of the Innocent https://www.amazon.com/Fall-Innocent-Karel-Roden/dp/B079NL6HTB

2011 films
2011 war drama films
2010s Czech-language films
World War II films based on actual events
Films about Operation Anthropoid
Films about war crimes
Films set in 1938
Films set in 1939
Czech war drama films
Slovak drama films
Films about massacres
2011 drama films
Czech World War II films
Czech films based on actual events
Czech epic films